Héctor Guillermo Osuna Jaime (born 25 June 1957) is a Mexican architect and politician affiliated with the National Action Party who acted as Municipal President of Tijuana between 1992 and 1995 and as President of the Federal Commission of Telecommunications between 2006 and 2010. As of 2014 he served as Senator of the LIX Legislature of the Mexican Congress  representing Baja California.

References

1957 births
Living people
Politicians from Mexico City
Mexican architects
Municipal presidents of Tijuana
Members of the Senate of the Republic (Mexico)
National Action Party (Mexico) politicians
21st-century Mexican politicians
Universidad Autónoma de Guadalajara alumni
Members of the Congress of Baja California
20th-century Mexican politicians